The teams competing in Group 9 of the 2013 UEFA European Under-21 Championship qualifying competition were France, Kazakhstan, Latvia, Romania, and Slovakia.

Standings

Results and fixtures

Goalscorers
3 goals

 Mihai Răduț
 Juraj Vavrík

2 goals

 Rémy Cabella
 Josuha Guilavogui
 Antoine Griezmann
 Steeven Joseph-Monrose
 Alexandre Lacazette 
 Eliaquim Mangala
 Emmanuel Rivière
 Raphaël Varane
 Gabriel Enache
 Róbert Mak
 Filip Oršula
 Arnold Šimonek
 Lukáš Štetina

1 goal

 Sébastien Corchia
 M'Baye Niang
 Vincent Pajot
 Abzal Beisebekov
 Ermek Kuantayev
 Deniss Rakels
 Marius Alexe
 Lucian Filip
 Gheorghe Grozav
 Cosmin Matei
 Nicolae Stanciu
 George Țucudean
 Matúš Čonka
 Ján Greguš
 Kristián Kolčák
 Marián Kolmokov
 Milan Lalkovič
 Adam Žilák

References

External links
Standings and fixtures at UEFA.com

Group 9